Fadi Zidan (born 2 June 1993) is a Palestinian footballer, currently playing for Zhetysu and Palestine.

Career
In March 2015, he became the first Palestinian player to score twice in the AFC Cup when he scored twice in Taraji Wadi Al-Nes's 6-2 loss to Al-Shorta of Iraq.

In February 2021, Zidan signed with Torpedo Kutaisi and was presented as a new player of the club.

Honours 
Taraji Wadi Al-Nes
Runners-up
 West Bank Premier League: 2013–14

Ahli Al-Khaleel
Champion
 Palestine Cup: 2015

References

External links 
 

1993 births
Living people
Israeli footballers
Palestinian footballers
Hapoel Nir Ramat HaSharon F.C. players
Shabab Al-Dhahiriya SC players
Taraji Wadi Al-Nes players
Ahli Al-Khaleel players
Maccabi Petah Tikva F.C. players
Hapoel Kfar Saba F.C. players
Hapoel Ramat Gan F.C. players
Hapoel Umm al-Fahm F.C. players
FC Torpedo Kutaisi players
Hapoel Rishon LeZion F.C. players
Hidd SCC players
Liga Leumit players
Israeli Premier League players
West Bank Premier League players
Bahraini Premier League players
Association football forwards
Footballers from Haifa
Expatriate footballers in Georgia (country)
Expatriate footballers in Bahrain
Israeli expatriate sportspeople in Georgia (country)
Israeli expatriate sportspeople in Bahrain
Palestinian expatriate sportspeople in Georgia (country)
Palestinian expatriate sportspeople in Bahrain
Palestine youth international footballers